Latona's shrew (Crocidura latona) is a species of shrew in the genus Crocidura. It is endemic to Democratic Republic of the Congo. Its natural habitat is subtropical or tropical moist lowland forests.

References

Latona's shrew
Mammals of the Democratic Republic of the Congo
Endemic fauna of the Democratic Republic of the Congo
Latona's shrew
Taxonomy articles created by Polbot